Phosphoserine (abbreviated as SEP or J) is an ester of serine and phosphoric acid. Phosphoserine is a component of many proteins as the result of posttranslational modifications. The phosphorylation of the alcohol functional group in serine to produce phosphoserine is catalyzed by various types of kinases. Through the use of technologies that utilize an expanded genetic code, phosphoserine can also be incorporated into proteins during translation.

It is a normal metabolite found in human biofluids.

Phosphoserine has three potential coordination sites (carboxyl, amine and phosphate group) Determination of the mode of coordination between phosphorylated ligands and metal ions occurring in an organism is a first step to explain the function of the phosphoserine in bioinorganic processes.

References

Amino acids
Organophosphates